The Doubles competition at the 2019 FIL World Luge Championships was held on 26 January 2019.

Results
The first run was held at 11:14 and the second run at 12:42.

References

Doubles